Ovamir Anjum is a Pakistani-American academic. He is the Imam Khattab Chair of Islamic Studies at the Department of Philosophy, University of Toledo. He studies the connections between theology, ethics, politics, and law in classical and medieval Islam, with a subfocus on its comparisons with western thought. Related fields of study include Islamic philosophy and Sufism.

Early life and education
Anjum was born in Karachi, Pakistan, into a family of Muhajir background and grew up in the Persian Gulf region before moving to the United States at age 18. He completed a Masters in Social Sciences from the University of Chicago and a Masters in Computer Science from the University of Wisconsin-Madison. He obtained his Ph.D. in Islamic intellectual history at the University of Wisconsin-Madison. His dissertation, published in 2012 by Cambridge University Press, is entitled Politics, Law, and Community in Islamic Thought: The Taymiyyan Moment.

Islamic State of Iraq and the Levant
He believes that the Islamic State of Iraq and the Levant is heretical and run by poorly educated imams stating that "their claim of being a caliphate is a joke" and that "If you’re actually learned in the Islamic tradition you would know that these people are heretics. It’s like saying the KKK is Christian."

Work

Books 

 Politics, Law and Community in Islamic Thought: The Taymiyyan Movement (CUP, 2012)

Translations 

 Ibn Qayyim al-Jawziyya, Ranks of the Divine Seekers: A Parallel English Arabic Text (Madarij al-Salikeen) (Brill, 2020)

Papers 

 "Is Contagion Real? Giving Context to Prophetic Wisdom" (Yaqeen, April 16, 2020)
 "Who Wants the Islamic Caliphate?" (Yaqeen, October 31, 2019)

References

Living people
21st-century Muslim scholars of Islam
University of Wisconsin–Madison College of Letters and Science alumni
American academics of Pakistani descent
American Muslims
Muhajir people
Pakistani emigrants to the United States
People from Karachi
University of Chicago alumni
Year of birth missing (living people)
Muslim scholars of Islamic studies